Militant Minds EP is a collaboration between Queensbridge rapper Tragedy Khadafi and Boston duo Blak Madeen (AI-J and Yusuf Abdul-Mateen), released in September 2012 as a free download in Bandcamp.

Track listing

References

2012 EPs
Tragedy Khadafi albums